The John Norton House is a historic house located at 820 Burleigh Drive in Pasadena, California. Built in 1954, the Modernist house was designed by Buff, Straub, and Hensman. The house is located in an arroyo below street level and is integrated with the surrounding nature, including a stream which flows past the front door. The house has a post-and-beam structure and features an open interior plan, a large deck, and large groups of exterior windows.

The house was added to the National Register of Historic Places on April 10, 2009.

References

External links

Houses in Pasadena, California
Houses completed in 1954
Houses on the National Register of Historic Places in California
Buildings and structures on the National Register of Historic Places in Pasadena, California
1950s architecture in the United States
Modernist architecture in California
1954 establishments in California